Full Hearts & Empty Rooms is the second extended play by Australian recording artist Emma Louise, released independently through Louise's Bandcamp on 31 March 2011.

The EP was later released independently on compact disc on 15 April 2011, with distribution handled by MGM Records. 

Full Hearts & Empty Rooms achieved minor critical and commercial success, debuting and peaking at number 93 on the ARIA Albums Chart and attaining a gold certification, and receiving the award for Best Independent Single/EP at the 2011 AIR Awards.

Recording
Full Hearts & Empty Rooms was recorded with Mark Myers, who produced and engineered the EP, whilst Matt Redlich mastered the tracks.

Critical reception

 
Kat Mahina from The AU Review said: "Full Hearts & Empty Rooms is a striking debut from a talented artist who is bound to make waves around the nation this year with her pretty, uncomplicated pop. Emma Louise wears her heart firmly on her sleeve. Now would be a good time to jump on board her band wagon."

Commercial performance
Full Hearts & Empty Rooms debuted and peaked at number 93 on the ARIA Albums Chart for the chart dated 19 October 2011. The EP was later certified gold on 30 September 2012.

Awards and nominations

AIR Awards

! 
|-
! scope="row" rowspan="2"| 2011
| Herself
| Best Breakthrough Independent Artist
| 
| 
|-
| Full Hearts & Empty Rooms
| Best Independent Single/EP
| 
| 
|}

Track listing

Personnel
Adapted from the EP's liner notes.

Musicians
 Emma Louise – writing, vocals, guitar 
Other musicians
 Mark Myers – bass, guitar, keys  
 Daniel Ogilvie – drums, percussion

Technical
 Mark Myers – production, engineering 
 Matt Redlich – mastering

Artwork
 Mel Baxter at Moonshine Madness – design, artwork

Charts

Certifications

Release history

References

Notes

External links
 

 
2011 EPs
Emma Louise EPs
Self-released EPs
MGM Records EPs